All Saints Church, also known as All Hallows Church, is a historical Protestant church in  Srinagar that is part of the Church of North India, a province of the worldwide Anglican Communion. All Saints Church falls within the Diocese of Amritsar and along with Holy Family Catholic Church, is one of the two Christian churches in the city. The church is dedicated to All Saints.

History 
All Saints church dates from the 1890s - at the time when the opening of the Jhelum Valley road, and the establishment of a British Residency in Kashmir, prompted an increasing number of Brits to come to Srinagar. It was a hill station - a place to escape the heat of the plains. And for a few hundred among the British, it became their home.

Architecture 
All Saints has changed hugely over the past 120 years. Only the base of the tower remains from the original construction. The church had been burnt down during protests in the 1960s and again in the 1970s. It was rebuilt using a Russian design, and making less use of wood to make it less vulnerable to fire. It was badly hit - along with so much of riverside Srinagar - in the 2014 floods. But it has recovered and is well maintained.

References 

Church of North India cathedrals
Churches in Jammu and Kashmir
Churches in Srinagar
19th-century churches in India
19th-century Anglican church buildings